Coniferyl alcohol is an organic compound with the formula HO(CH3O)C6H3CH=CHCH2OH. A colourless or white solid, it is one of the monolignols, produced via the phenylpropanoid biochemical pathway. When copolymerized with related aromatic compounds, coniferyl alcohol forms lignin or lignans. Coniferin is a glucoside of coniferyl alcohol. Coniferyl alcohol is an intermediate in biosynthesis of eugenol and of stilbenoids and coumarin. Gum benzoin contains significant amount of coniferyl alcohol and its esters. It is found in both gymnosperm and angiosperm plants. Sinapyl alcohol and paracoumaryl alcohol, the other two lignin monomers, are found in angiosperm plants and grasses.

Occurrence
Coniferyl alcohol is produced from coniferyl aldehyde by the action of dehydrogenase enzymes. 

It is a queen retinue pheromone (QRP), a type of honey bee pheromone found in the mandibular glands.

In Forsythia intermedia a dirigent protein was found to direct the stereoselective biosynthesis of (+)-pinoresinol from coniferyl alcohol. Recently, a second, enantiocomplementary dirigent protein was identified in Arabidopsis thaliana, which directs enantioselective synthesis of (−)-pinoresinol.

References 

Monolignols
O-methylated phenylpropanoids
Semiochemicals
Insect pheromones